Rosaline Margaret Frank (21 December 1864 – 6 October 1954), known as Rose Frank, was a New Zealand photographer. She was born in Nelson, New Zealand, on 21 December 1864. When she was 21, she started working as an assistant to the Tyree brothers at their photographic studio in Trafalgar Street. William Tyree was specialised in studio portraits and recording civic occasions in Nelson. His younger brother, Fred, took scenic views. Frank had excellent handwriting and the required talents for the high standard of studio photography.

She died in Nelson in 1954 and was buried in Wakapuaka Cemetery.

Her legacy was a collection of about 200,000 glass-plate negatives, dating from the early days of settlement. It was based on the work of the Tyree brothers but incorporated negatives by other photographers, including herself.

References 

1864 births
1954 deaths
19th-century New Zealand photographers
New Zealand women photographers
People from Nelson, New Zealand
Burials at Wakapuaka Cemetery
20th-century New Zealand photographers
19th-century women photographers
20th-century women photographers